William Rush (born August 26, 1952) is an American musician, guitarist, composer, producer, arranger and engineer who started working professionally in 1964. Rush is especially known for his lengthy association with Southside Johnny and the Asbury Jukes as guitarist and composer (from 1975 to 1985) and for his work as guitarist and musical director with Serge Gainsbourg from 1984 until 1991.

Biography 
William Rush (also known as Billy Rush or Little Willie Rush) was born on August 26, 1952, in Deal, New Jersey. He played with Southside Johnny and The Asbury Jukes from 1975 to 1985, acting as guitarist and composing several songs for the band. In 1984 he started working with Serge Gainsbourg, also performing with Taka Boom (Yvonne Steven) in 1985, Charlotte Gainsbourg in 1986, Bambou (Caroline Paulus) in 1989.

Rush was also a member of a small hard rock band called Liddle, Rush and Thrall in 2002 with Pat Thrall on drums, Tony Liddle on guitar & singins and Rush on vocals.

Rush lives in Fort Lauderdale, Florida.

Years As Composer, Producer and Engineer (1964 - Today) 
Rush composed for Muddy Waters (1964-1997), John Hammond (1965), Bo Didley (1968), Camel Pressure Points (1984), Brian Kennedy (1990), Kolibri (1990), Boxcar (1990), Chris Walker (1991), Psychic TV (1994), Jerry Clower (1994), Debbie Davies (1994), Jimmy Hall (1996), Slo Leak (1996) Boukan Ginen (1997), David Michael Frank (2001), Chris Thomas King (2004) Jimi Hendrix (2005–2008), Lloyd Price (2006).

Creation of BoozeBlackBerry, Change for Asbury Jukes and arrived of Billy Rush in group (1968 - 1975) 
Before 1974 Miami Steven Van Zandt played with Al Berger Dovells in support of the band and Southside Johnny began playing with the orchestra for which BoozeBlackBerry Kenny Pentifallo already playing drums. It was this band that eventually developed in the Asbury Jukes. The original BBB had played together since 1968 and before 1974 had represented a line of Paul Green (harmonica, vocals), Paul Dickler (guitar), David Meyers (bass) and Kenny Pentifallo (Drums) . They s were established as the orchestra at a new club, the stone pony. Green was the lead singer of the band but he preferred to play the harmonica. Meanwhile, Southside played harmonica with the Blues Street Band, but had few opportunities to sing in advance. Green and Southside effectively exchanged Southside band and soon emerged as the leader of BBB, referring Dickler (who did not like Steven Van Zandt) and Meyers, Pentifallo but keeping a battery. He was subsequently recruited Kevin Kavanagh and Van Zandt, who in turn recruited Al Berger and in June 1975, inspired by Little Walter and the Jukes they changed their name to the Asbury Jukes suddenly Steven Van Zandt made Asbury Jukes jackets by burning it and this is why Meyers and Green did not like his clothes there at that time. The original Jukes Paravant the line was then supplemented with additional Mexican American Carlo Novi sax player and tenor Billy Rush (guitar) arrived in February 1975 in the band.

Years Of Guitarist (1975 - 1979) 
Rush was one of the guitarist recruited to the changes of name of band (When the group has to change under the name of Asbury Jukes has the place of BoozeBlackBerry in 1975) from 1975 to 1985 in February 1975 with Steven Van Zandt (Which was already in the group before he changes a name) of 1975 has 1979, Steve is thus the composer and a guitarist of the Jukes and the first three Albums of Asbury Jukes such as I Don't Want to Go Home appeared in 1976, It's This Time It's for Real appeared in 1977 and Hearts of Stone appeared in 1978 which will be the last album on which Van Zandt would compose and appear with Rush for Southside Johnny, because towards the end of 1978, Steve Van Zandt got caught speeding by Bruce Springsteen, and of the blow Steve goes away with The Boss Bruce Springsteen, But Steve makes his(her) departure by keeping(guarding) the link with John Lyons ( Southside Johnny) and his(her) musicians composers that he knows in that she(it) he has to work with but in 1991 Southside Johnny Lyon and his group prepares and goes out a new album Better Days on which Steve Van Zandt is ré to engage as composer and vocalist of this albums but without Billy Rush who had left in 1985 of Jukes to join the French singer Serge Gainsbourg who fell in love on Billy Rush by listening to the album Trash It Up of Asbury Jukes and Serge Gainsbourg dies on March 2, 1991, the same year or The Jukes prepared and took out their albums Better Days with Bobby Bandiera the guitarist, the composer and the replacement of Billy Rush in Jukes, Bruce Springsteen and Steve Van Zandt.

Years Guitar and Composer (1979 - 1989) 
In 1979, Billy Rush saw Southside Johnny and the Asbury Jukes who underwent several major changes. Billy Rush has already started working in the Jukes in 1975 playing only guitar, and their first three studio albums (I Don't Want to Go Home, That's For Real and Hearts of Stone) as well as their first live album, Live at the Bottom Line (1976) had only been moderate commercial successes and they were eventually based on Epic Records. His growing engagements at Bruce Springsteen distanced Steve Van Zandt from the Jukes and for the lives and concert of 1978 Southside recruited another guitarist to replace Steve Van Zandt who is named Joel (Cage) Gramolini who stayed from 1978 to 1981 and c 'Who placed Billy Rush as the co-leader of the band and chief songwriter of the following 3 studio albums because Rush had been working in the band for 4 years. Their next three albums were released at Mercury. The album The Jukes was recorded at the "Muscle Shoals Sound" and produced by Barry Beckett and composed by Billy Rush, in 1979 Southside Johnny record one album bootleg in Asbury Park the 08/08/1979 on the radio. Then came the studio album Love Is A Sacrifice (1980) composed by Billy Rush, the album Reach Up And Touch The Sky, 1980's live album released in 1981. He was assisted by Stephan Galfas for production. In 1982 Southside Johnny & Billy Rush believes that it is necessary to change the name of the group by Southside Johnny & The Jukes to have more success to the purchases of album sales and listening. About 1983 Southside, Rush wrote two not far from nine songs and four remixes at least on their album titled Trash It Up (1983) which reaches the ears of Philippe Lerichomme and Serge Gainsbourg for his album Love On The Beat (1984) ), It was Lerichomme who found this album at a record store in Paris and made him listen to Gainsbourg. Gainsbourg finds that he likes the album and leaves for New Jersey to meet Southside Johnny to see Billy Rush so he takes part in recording Love On The Beat on guitar, bass and drums. Trash It Up was released by Mirage Reports and produced by Nile Rodgers who did not have time to produce Serge Gainsbourg's Love On The Beat as Rodgers was to produce for Madonna (Like a Virgin) 1984 and David Bowie (Let's Dance) 1983 so Niles will let Billy Rush produce Gainsbourg's album which was more successful listening and buying while the album Trash It Up by Southside Johnny & the Asbury jukes n 'Had no success in buying and listening then during the year 1984 the album In The Heat composed by Billy Rush who saw the Asbury Jukes lowering more and more to buying and listening . It also marked the end of the association of Billy Rush with the Jukes who announced his departure in January 1985 because Billy Rush considers that the Asbury Jukes do not represent anything for him and wants to do other things leaving the Group by joining Serge Gainsbourg in the spring of 1985 who called on him for the rehearsals of his future concert at the Casino de Paris 1985 and his tour throughout France in 1985, Billy Rush took the place of the English guitarist Alan Parker because Billy has a success Better than Alan, Gainsbourg and Billy also took the place of guitarists Doughie Brian and Michael Chung the ex guitarist Bob Marley that Serge Gainsbourg had recruited for his album Aux Armes Et Caetera and his live album at the Palace 1979 five years earlier, And Rush was also the musical director of the band of musicians of Gainsbourg during the tour of 1985 and the last tour of 1988. After the departure of Billy Rush, Billy Rush was replaced from 1985 to 2010 in the jukes by Bobby Bandiera in January 1985 who called on him and agreed to take his place and Bobby Bandiera worked on the album In The Heat by Southside Johnny as a vocalist, Bobby replaced Billy until 2010 after being recruited by the Bon Jovi group, Suddenly another guitarist named Glenn Alexander replaces Bobby from 2010 to today. And after the departure of Billy Rush from the band Billy Rush continued composing and playing for Taka Boom (1985) who also worked on the album In The Heat of Jukes as vocalist, Serge Gainsbourg (1984 - 1988) Billy Rush accompanies Serge Gainsbourg to record live albums and filming his last two concerts at the Casino de Paris in 1985 and at the Zénith de Paris in 1988 recorded in France, and his latest studio album You're Under Arrest recorded in New Jersey (1987 ) Billy Rush also produced for Charlotte Gainsbourg, daughter of Serge Gainsbourg, for his studio album Charlotte For Ever the BOF of the film (1986) recorded in New Jersey, Bambou (Caroline Paulus) the last companion of Serge Gainsbourg for its 45 turn Lulu (1986) recorded in New Jersey and for his studio album Made In China (1989) recorded in New Jersey

End of the works with Serge Gainsbourg New composition for other artists, death of Serge Gainsbourg, Retrouved of Bambou, Continuation in the composition and Retirement of the Composition (1990-present)
In 1990, Gainsbourg had begun to write a new blues-influenced album that was to be recorded in New Orleans in March 1991, without Billy Rush and the rest of his usual musical collaborators except for Gary Georgett, as he wanted jazz musicians, but unfortunately the album wasn’t to be as on March 2, Gainsbourg died as a result of a heart attack at his home in Paris. March 4 he had to make the music and lyrics in demo recorded end of 1990 which was to give Phillipe Lerichome it than the day before his death. Serge Gainsbourg will be buried at the Montparnasse cemetery, March 7 is what reallymarked the end of the work of Billy Rush and Serge Gainsbourg in 1991 but especially in 1990 as Serge was most need him for his future album which will never exist which should be save in 1990, in 1992 a label of music releases the album Live of Southside Johnny and The Asbury Jukes (Live 10 / 15/1984) Recorded at the Bayou Club in Washington named All I Want Is Everything in audio CD and K7 video, the same year a compilation regrouping the songs between 1976 and 1978 of Southside Johnny and The Asbury Jukes goes out with Having a Party in live version Rare audio studio. In 2001, Serge Gainsbourg's DVD was released in Gainsbarre for the 10th anniversary of his death and in the same year Billy found Bambou, Serge Gainsbourg's last companion, and their son, Lulu Gainsbourg, wanted to record by singing the Gainsbourg song. Sung by Bamboo duo with his son Lulu Gainsbourg this reprise of this song composed by Serge Gainsbourg is a tribute for the 10 years of the death of Serge Gainsbourg disappeared in 1991, Lulu Gainsbourg is 15 years old, Billy Rush is aged 49 Years he finds Bambou and Lulu and the American musicians who knew him when he worked with Serge Gainsbourg at the time, alas, he will not play on this song while the other American musicians Serge participated in this song Do not say Nothing, 10 years later in 2011 Lulu Gainsbourg made an album in homage for the 20 years of his father 's death with the rest of the musicians of Serge, Billy Rush will not be on the album and had to be replaced by another one, Other guitarists, because since the death of Serge Gainsbourg in 1991, Billy Rush no longer wants to hear about Serge Gainsbourg definitively. In 2002, Billy Rush decided to get back into the music and took part in a small hard rock band called Liddle Rush And Thrall with Pat Thrall on guitar, Tony Liddell on drums and Billy Rush on vocals and voices. Tony and Pat are friends of Billy Rush, their band has had no success and their studio albums Law (2002) were a failure to buy and listen. In 2004 a DVD was released on the concert of Southside Johnny & The Asbury Jukes at rockpalast and grughalle essen in Germany and also the same year a compilation album of 12 songs with rare demo from Southside Johnny & The Asbury Jukes not released at the time In 2007, an album of 5 CD compilation spring with demo songs not released at the time of Southside Johnny and the Asbury Jukes, after the video K7 video of the concerts of Gainsbourg at the Casino of Paris and the Zenith emerges in DVD the Casino in 2006 and the Zenith in 2008, in 2008 released the album Live In Boston 1978 by Southside Johnny & The Asbury Jukes for the 30 years of the tour Hearts Of Stone Tour, in 2014 emerge the albums Love On The Beat, And Serge Gainsbourg's You're Under Arrest with remixed and rare songs signed by Gainsbourg, a book with a CD, in bookshops that sold from 2013 to 2014, and in 2015 releases the album Serge Gainsbourg Live (Casino de Paris 1985) on CD and vinyl LPs on sale at the Fnac and Cultura with remixes, reprise and unpublished for the 30th anniversary of this concert in November the same year released the album Live Bottom Line 1977 New York City of Asbury Jukes not released At the time. Billy Rush is retired from the composition for the moment but still plays the guitar for his pleasure at home

Instruments of Music Used by Billy Rush 

Billy plays various instruments such as bass, drums, keyboards, synth for drum programming and especially guitar, for certain album, Rush plays that of the guitar and others it divides the instrument on the song replaying the Music over, for the concerts of Southside Johnny & Gainsbourg in the middle of the 80's Billy had to call to other musicians playing bass, keyboard and drums because Rush could not do everything especially on the last 2 Tour of Serge Gainsbourg in 1985 and 1988, it was more around 1983 during the period of the album Trash It Up of Asbury Jukes that Billy touched to the various musical instruments.

. (Guitare)

Fender Stratocaster
Gibson Les Paul
Schecter Stratocaster

. (Synthesizers & Keyboards)

Yamaha

. (Bass guitar)

Fender Jazz Bass Precision

. (Drums)

Zildjian

Discography 
Muddy Waters
 Muddy Waters : Folk Singer (1964) Composer
 Muddy Waters: Live At Mr. Kelly's (1971) Composer
 Muddy Waters: Muddy & the Wolf (1974) Composer
 Muddy Waters: Sings Big Bill Broonzy/Folk Singer (1986) Composer
 Muddy Waters: The Chess Box (1990) Composer
 Muddy Waters: Muddy Waters [Bella Musica] (1991) Composer
 Muddy Waters: His Best, 1947 to 1955 (1997) Composer

John Hammond
 John Hammond : So Many Roads (1965) Composer

Bo Diddley
 Bo Diddley : Super Blues (1968) Composer

Southside Johnny and The Asbury Jukes
 Southside Johnny & the Asbury Jukes: I Don't Want To Go Home (1976) Guitar
 Southside Johnny & the Asbury Jukes: Live 1976 at the Bottom Line (1976) Guitar
 Southside Johnny & the Asbury Jukes: This Times It's For Real (1977) Guitar
 Southside Johnny & The Asbury Jukes: Without Love (1977) Guitar
 Southside Johnny & The Asbury Jukes: Love On The Wrong Side Of Town (1977) Guitar
 Southside Johnny & The Asbury Jukes: The Fever (1977) Guitar
 Southside Johnny & The Asbury Jukes: Havin' A Party / Little By Little (1977) Guitar
 Southside Johnny & The Asbury Jukes: Little Girl So Fine (1977) Guitar
 Southside Johnny & The Asbury Jukes: A Gift From Southside Johnny And The Asbury Jukes - 7", Single, Promo (1977) Guitar
 Southside Johnny & the Asbury Jukes: Hearts of Stone (1978) Member of Group, Guitar, Member d'Artists Attribued.
 Southside Johnny & The Asbury Jukes: Talk To Me (1978) Member of Group, Guitar, Guitar Rhythmic
 Southside Johnny & The Asbury Jukes: I Played The Fool (1978) Member of Group, Guitar Guitar Rhythmic
 Southside Johnny & The Asbury Jukes: Trapped Again (1978) Member of Group, Guitar, Guitar Rhythmic
 Southside Johnny & the Asbury Jukes: Havin' a Party With Southside Johnny (1979) Member of Group, Guitar, Member d'Artists Attributed
 Southside Johnny & the Asbury Jukes: The Jukes (1979) Composer, Guitar, Vocalist, Member D'artists Attributed and Chorus
 Southside Johnny & The Asbury Jukes: All I Want Is Everything - Todo Lo Que Quiero Es Todo (1979) Composer, Guitar, Chorus
 Southside Johnny & The Asbury Jukes: I'm So Anxious (1979) Composer, Guitar, Chorus.
 Southside Johnny : Juke Boss "Album Live Bootleg Recorded In Asbury Park New Jersey 1979/08/08" (1979) Guitar and Chorus
 Southside Johnny & the Asbury Jukes: Love is a Sacrifice (1980) Composer, Guitar, Producteur, Chorus.
 Southside Johnny & The Asbury Jukes: On The Beach (1980) Composer, Guitar, Chorus
 Southside Johnny & the Asbury Jukes: Reach up and Touch the Sky Live 1980 (1981) Guitar, Member d'Artists Attributed, Chorus
 Southside Johnny & The Asbury Jukes: All I Want Is Everything - Reach up and Touch the Sky Live 1980 (1981) Composer, Guitar, et Chorus
 Southside Johnny & The Asbury Jukes: All I Want Is Everything / Restless Heart - Reach up and Touch the Sky Live 1980 (1981) Composer, Guitar and Chorus
 Southside Johnny & The Asbury Jukes: Vertigo / All I Want Is Everything (7", Single) - Reach up and Touch the Sky Live 1980 (1981) Composer, Guitar and Chorus
 Southside Johnny & the Asbury Jukes: Trash it Up (1983) Composer, Guitar
 Southside Johnny & the Asbury Jukes: Trash it Up Remix (1983) Composer, Guitar.
 Southside Johnny & The Jukes: Trash it Up - Single (1983) Composer, Guitar
 Southside Johnny & The Jukes: Get Your Body On The Job / Slow Burn (1983) Composer, Guitar
 Southside Johnny & the Asbury Jukes: Get Up Your Body On The Job Remix 45 Tour Lp (1983) Composer, Guitar
 Southside Johnny & the Asbury Jukes: In the Heat (1984) Composer, Guitar, Producer and Synthetiser
 Southside Johnny & the Asbury Jukes: In The Heat - 45 Tour Lp, Love Is The Drug 1 Version Remixed, Captured 3 Versions Version Remixed & New Romeo 2 Version Remixed (1984) Composer, Guitar, Synthetiser
 Southside Johnny & The Jukes: New Romeo Single (1984) Composer, Guitar, Synthetiser
 Southside Johnny & The Jukes: Love Is The Drug (1984) Composer, Guitar, Synthetiser
 Southside Johnny & The Jukes: Captured (1984) Composer, Guitar, Synthetiser
 Various Artistes: Sound Of The Years (1985) Composer, Guitar, Synthetiser
 Southside Johnny & The Jukes: Walk Away Renée / Can't Stop Thinking Of You (1986) Composer, Guitar
 Southside Johnny & the Asbury Jukes: All I Want is Everything Recorded Live During the Tour in the U.S.A. Washington DC Club Bayou (1992) Guitar and Chorus
 Southside Johnny & The Asbury Jukes: The Best Of Southside Johnny & The Asbury Jukes (1992) Guitars & Chorus
 Southside Johnny & the Asbury Jukes: All I Want Is Everything The Best of Southside Johnny & the Asbury Jukes (1993), Guitar, Composer, 
 Southside Johnny & the Asbury Jukes: Restless Heart (1998) Composer, Guitar
 Southside Johnny & The Asbury Jukes: Super Hits (2001) Guitar
 Southside Johnny & The Asbury Jukes: Missing Pieces (2004) Guitar, Composer and Vocals
 Southside Johnny & the Asbury Jukes: Jukebox [30 ème Anniversary] (2006) Guitar, Chorus, Member of Group, Member d'Artists Attributed, Composer, Interpreter, Producer and Synthesizer
 Southside Johnny & the Asbury Jukes: Live 1978 in Boston (2008) Guitar and Chorus
 Southside Johnny & The Asbury Jukes: Fever Anthology 1976 - 1991 (2008) Guitar
 Southside Johnny & the Asbury Jukes: I Don't Want To Go Home/This Time It's For Real (2013)	Guitar
 Southside Johnny & the Asbury Jukes: Playlist The Very Best of Southside Johnny & the Asbury Jukes (2013) Producer, Composer
 Southside Johnny & the Asbury Jukes: Live 1977 at the Bottom Line NYC (2015) Guitar
 Southside Johnny and the Asbury Jukes: The Fever—The Remastered Epic Recordings (2 CD) Original recording remastered (2017) Guitar

Camel
 Camel: Pressure Points: Live In Concert (1984) Composer

Serge Gainsbourg
 Serge Gainsbourg: Love on the Beat (1984) Bass, Programmation of drums, Guitar
 Serge Gainsbourg: Love On The Beat (Single 7) 45 tour (1984) Guitar, Bass and Programming of Drums
 Serge Gainsbourg: Love On The Beat, Long Box Version 45 Tour For Jukebox 2 Version Remixed de Love On The Beat (1984) Basse Program Drums, Guitar
 Serge Gainsbourg: Collection (1984) Bass, Programming of Drums and Guitar
 Serge Gainsbourg: No Comment Version Courte et Version Extended (1984) Guitar, Bass, Programming of Drums
 Serge Gainsbourg: Gainsbourg LIVE (1985) Direction Musical, Réalization and Guitar.
 Serge Gainsbourg: Live - Sorry Angel / Bonnie And Clyde (1985) Direction Musical, Realization and Guitar
 Serge Gainsbourg: Live - My Lady Heroïne / Je Suis Venu Te Dire Que Je M'en Vais (1985) Direction Musical, Realization and Guitar
 Gainsbourg: Vieille Canaille / Lola Rastaquouère (1985) Direction Musical, Realization and Guitar
 Serge Gainsbourg: You're Under Arrest (1987) Direction, Guitar, Producer, Realization.
 Serge Gainsbourg: You're Under Arrest Remix (1987) Guitar and Direction Musical
 Serge Gainsbourg: Mon Légionnaire Remix (1987) Guitar et Direction Musical
 Serge Gainsbourg: Master Série Vol 1 (1987) Bass Programming of drums and Guitar
 Serge Gainsbourg: Le Zénith de Gainsbourg (1988) Direction Musical, Realization and Guitar.
 Serge Gainsbourg: Vol 2 (1988) Guitar, Bass and Programming of Drums
 Serge Gainsbourg: De Gainsbourg a Gainsbarre (1990) Bass, Programming Of Drums, Guitar and Director Musical
 Serge Gainsbourg: De Gainsbourg a Gainsbarre Vol 1 (1991) Bass, Guitar, Programming Of Drums and Director Musical
 Serge Gainsbourg: Master Série Vol 1 et 2 (1992) Bass, Director Musical. Programming of Drums and Guitar
 Serge Gainsbourg: De Serge Gainsbourg a Gainsbarre (1996) Guitar, Bass, Programming Of Drums, Director Musical
 Serge Gainsbourg: Classe X (1998) Producer
 Serge Gainsbourg: De Gainsbourg à Gainsbarre 11 CD Box (1998) Bass, Director, Drum Programming, Guitar, 
Guitar
 Serge Gainsbourg: Classé X (1998) Direction Musical, Guitar, Bass, Ptogramming Drum
 Serge Gainsbourg: Le Poinçonneur des Lilas Vol 1 Ses Plus Belles Chanson (1999) Direction Musical Guitar Programming of Drums and bass
 Serge Gainsbourg: Serge Gainsbourg, Vol. 1 (1999) Bass, Drum Programming, Guitar, Producer
 Serge Gainsbourg: Serge Gainsbourg (2000) Bass, Director Musical, Programming of drums & Guitar
 Serge Gainsbourg: Gainsbourg Forever 2 CD (2001) Guitar, Bass, Direction
 Serge Gainsbourg: Vols 3 (2001) Guitar, Bass and programing of drums
 Serge Gainsbourg: Anthologie (2003) Director Musical, Programing of Drums, Guitar and Bass
 Serge Gainsbourg: Love On The Beat Vols 1 et 2 (2004) Guitar bass, programing of drums and Direction
 Serge Gainsbourg: CD Story (2006) Programming Drum, Guitar and bass
 Serge Gainsbourg: Les 100 Plus Belles Chanson (2006) Guitar bass programing of drums and direction
 Serge Gainsbourg: The Original (2006) Bass, Programing of Drums and Guitar
 Serge Gainsbourg: Serge Gainsbourg (2007) Guitar, Bass, Programming of Drums and Direction
 Serge Gainsbourg: New Collection (2008) Guitare Bass Programming of Tambours et Direction
 Serge Gainsbourg: Love On The Beat & You're Under Arrest 2 CD Album Box (2010) Guitar, Bass Programming of Drums and Direction
 Serge Gainsbourg: Gainsbourg Box Set Intégrale (2011) Bass, Guitar, Direction
 Serge Gainsbourg: The Best Of Comme Un Boomerang (2011) Bass, Direction, Guitar
 Serge Gainsbourg: Vamps et Vampire The Songs of Serge Gainsbourg (2014) Arranger, Conductor, Producer
 Serge Gainsbourg: Signé Gainsbourg "Love On The Beat and You're Under Arrest (2014) Guitar, Direction, Realization and Production
 Serge Gainsbourg: Serge Gainsbourg Live Casino de Paris 1985 Edition 30 ème anniversaries (3 Vinyl 33T and 2 CD and 1 DVD) (2015) Direction Musical and Guitar
 Serge Gainsbourg: Le Cinéma de Serge Gainsbourg (2015) Guitar and Direction Musical
 Serge Gainsbourg: Serge Gainsbourg Live Casino de Paris 1985 Edition 30 ème anniversaire Éditions (2 CD) (2016) Direction Musical and Guitar
 Serge Gainsbourg: Gainsbourg & Co, Best Of (2 CD) (25 ans "Dead Of Serge Gainsbourg") Direction, Musical and Guitar (2016)

Jane Birkin

Jane Birkin: Mes images Privé de Serge (2013) Guitar, Bass and Programming of Drums

Taka Boom
 Taka Boom: Middle of the Night (1985) Composer, DX-7, Guitar, Piano (Electric), Producer, Synthetiser, Bass Of Synthetiser.
 Taka Boom: Middle Of The Night "Single" (1985) Composer, DX-7, Guitar, Piano (Electric), Producer, Synthetiser, Bass Of Synthetiser.
 Taka Boom: Climate For Love (1985) Composer, DX-7, Guitar, Piano (Electric), Producer, Synthetiser, Bass Of Synthetiser.

People (8)
 People (8): Talk To Me (1985) Producer

Charlotte Gainsbourg
 Charlotte Gainsbourg: Charlotte For Ever (1986) Guitar, Direction Musical
 Charlotte Gainsbourg: Charlotte* & Gainsbourg* / Charlotte For Ever -"Single" (1986) Guitar, Direction Musical
 Charlotte Gainsbourg:  Elastique "Single" (1986) Guitar, Direction Musical
 Charlotte Gainsbourg: Zéro Pointé Vers L'infini / Oh Daddy Oh "7", Single" (1986) Guitare, Direction Musical

Bambou
 Bambou: Lulu (1986) Guitar and Synthetiser
 Bambou: Made In China (1989) Guitar, Synthetiser
 Bambou: Hey Mister Zippo (1989) Guitar and Synthetiser
 Bambou: Nuits De Chine (1989) Guitar and Synthetiser

Boxcar
 Boxcar: Vertigo (1990) Composer

Kolibri
 Kolibri: Manera Povedenia [
 of Behavior] (1990) Composer

Brian Kennedy
 Brian Kennedy: Great War of Words (1990) Composer

Chris Walker
 Chris Walker: First Time (1991) 
Composer

Various Artists
 Various Artists: Guitar Player Presents Legends of Guitar: Electric Blues, Vol. 2 (1991) Composer
 Various Artist: The Loving Time (1997) Composer

Psychic TV
 Psychic TV: A Pagan Day (1994) Composer

Jerry Clower
 Jerry Clower: Jerry Joins the Navy (1994) Composer

Debbie Davies
 Debbie Davies: Loose Tonight (1994) Engineer, Mixing, Producer

Jimmy Hall
 Jimmy Hall: Rendezvous with the Blues (1996) Composer

Slo Leak
 Slo Leak: Slo Leak (1996) Engineer

Boukan Ginen
 Boukan Ginen: Rev Au Nou (1997) Engineer

Bruce Springsteen:
 Bruce Springsteen: One Step Up/Two Steps Back The Songs of Bruce Springsteen (1997) Guitar

David Michael Frank
 David Michael Frank: The Mole Original Television Soundtrack (2001) Composer

Liddle Rush & Thrall
 Liddell Rush and Thrall: Law (2002), Vocals
 Liddle Rush and Thrall: Rock The Nation III (2003) Vocals

Chris Thomas
 Chris Thomas King: Along the Blues Highway (2004) Composer

Jimi Hendrix
 Jimi Hendrix: Live at Woodstock DVD (2005) Producer

Lloyd Price
 Lloyd Price: Specialty Profiles (2006) Composer

We owe him also 3 song of which Security whom he wrote and compromise and to sing word and to play the music has the guitar in the album studio The Jukes of 1979 and in the album compilation jukebox of 2006 in demo of Southside Johnny and The Asbury Jukes with where i can doh from miserable wretch and let me hide in demo that Billy wrote to make up to sing word and to play also in the album compilation jukebox of 2006 of Southside Johnny & The Asbury Jukes

Filmography 
 Southside Johnny & the Asbury Jukes: Having A Party (1992) VHS Live 1984 Concert Complete Filmed At Club Bayou Washington DC, Guitar and Chorus
 Serge Gainsbourg: De Serge Gainsbourg A Gainsbarre (1958 - 1991) DVD (2001) Direction Musical, Guitar Bass Programming of Drums and Realization
 Gainsbourg...* - Casino De Paris - Le Zénith - Live 1986 - 1989 "2xDVD, RE, RM, BOX" (2002) Direction Musical and Guitar
 Serge Gainsbourg: D'autres Nouvelles des Étoiles (1958 - 1986) DVD (2005), Direction Musical Guitare, Programming of drums and Bass
 Southside Johnny & the Asbury Jukes: Live 1979 AT Rockpalast From Germany (2004) DVD Guitar and Chorus
 Serge Gainsbourg: Gainsbourg... Casino de Paris Live 1986 (2006) DVD Direction Musical, Realization and Guitar
 Serge Gainsbourg: Gainsbourg... Le Zenith Live 1989 (2008) DVD Direction Musical, Realization and Guitar

TV Programm 

 unknown—Good Day New York (TV show, interview only)

unknown—Various appearances on local Cleveland TV shows

unknown—TV jingles for Chunky & NJ Bell [unconfirmed]

5-30-76–12-min. documentary featuring footage of a Stone
.             Pony concert with Bruce S. & Lee Dorsey.
.             Shown on UHF channel U-68 in the NYC metro area.

1977—Between the lines (movie cameo, plus soundtrack)
.             This fun little film has a stellar cast, featuring
.             Jeff Goldblum as a Southside fan (and bootleg
.             collecter).  One crucial scene is set at a party,
.             where the Jukes are performing "Sweeter than Honey"
.             and "Having a Party".  Also on the soundtrack:
.             "Fannie Mae" & "I don't want to go home."

4-5-77—OGWT studio performance (British TV)
.             "Without love" & "The Fever"

11-22-77—OGWT special (British TV)

late 1970s—appearances on the Mike Douglas TV show

late 1970s—Don Kirshner's Rock Concert (1st appearance)
.               Promoting "This time it's for real" album.
.               "Without love" & "Little by little"

1978—Live promo clip of SSJ singing "Without love"

8-31-78—Live from the Agora (30 min.) 
.             Aired on local Cleveland TV, perhaps elsewhere.
.             "The Fever", "I don't want to go home", "Having a 
.             party"  (incl. Bruce, Steve VanZandt, Clarence)

1979—Don Kirshner's Rock Concert (2nd appearance)
.             Live footage from Aug. Asbury Park show (4 songs)

1979—Soundstage (PBS TV show, 1 hour)
.             Concert from Chicago, also featuring Junior Wells

10-2-79—OGWT film footage (British TV)  "Vertigo"
1980—On the beach (music video)
.             (pre-MTV; shown on HBO's "video jukebox")

1981—All my children (TV show cameo)

1981—Second City Television ("The Fever" & "Everything")
.             Also includes a skit with Patti Scialfa and the 
.             Jukes acting as a band at Ed Grimley's wedding.

5-17-81—Taping date for "Eddie and the Cruisers" movie.
.             (alternate ending featured the Jukes—not released)

1982—Welcome to Miller Time (TC commercial)

1982—Rick Derringer's Rock Spectacular (laserdisc)
.             Taped at the Ritz, NYC  (Pioneer Artists PA-85-091)
.             SSJ on lead vocals & harmonica for "Honey Hush"
.             (Lou W. Turner) & "Five Long Years" (Eddie Boyd)

1983—Trash it up (music video)

1984—New Romeo  (music video)

1984—Regis Philbin TV show
.             Released by Castle Music Video (cat. no. CMV 1043).

1984—Showtime special (cable TV concert)  
.             [Possibly the same show as above]

1984?     --  Interview on French TV, plus club appearances with 
.             Little Bob Story on 2 songs; includes live segment 
.             of a NJ concert.m
1984—Tuff Turf (movie soundtrack)
Serge Gainsbourg - With Michel Drucker (Theater Champs Elysée) In Paris TV Programm the 05/04/1986
Serge Gainsbourg - Show & interview in 1986 At Montreal Canada
Serge Gainsbourg - Interview of Télé Matin France 2 (In Zénith of Paris) France 22 March 1988

Concert Filmed and recorded who never marketed and List of concert and tour 

  Southside Johnny & The Asbury Juke

I Don't Want To Go Home Tour (1976)

1975 - every Tuesday/Thursday/Sunday - Stone Pony, Asbury Pk.
1976 - early '76 - every Tuesday/Thursday/Sunday - Stone Pony
1976-01-23 Gangplank - Long Branch NJ
1976-01-24 Gangplank - Long Branch NJ
1976-01-30 Gangplank - Long Branch NJ
1976-xx-xx New Haven CT
1976-05-30 Stone Pony - Asbury Park NJ
1976-07-14 Carlton Theatre - Red Bank NJ
1976-08-01 Jabberwocky Club - Syracuse NY
1976-09-12 Tomorrow Club - Youngstown OH
1976-09-13 Live at the Agora - Cleveland OH
1976-09-18 Lisner Auditorium - George Washington Univ
1976-10-20 Jabberwocky Club, Syracuse U., NY
1976-10-30 Roxy - Los Angeles, CA
1976-11-06 The Savoy - San Francisco CA
1976-11-19 Jed's - New Orleans LA
1976-11-20 Jed's - New Orleans LA
1976-11-21 Jed's - New Orleans LA
1976-12-18 Stone Pony, Asbury Park NJ
1976-12-31 Speaks - Lido Beach - Long Island

This Time It's For Real Tour (1977)

1977-01-01 WDHA - FM Interview - phone in
1977-01-07 Carlton Theater - Red Bank NJ
1977-01-21 TG's East - Greenwood Lake NY
1977-01-22 Wagner College Gym - Staten Island, NY
1977-01-25 Seton Hall Gym - S. Orange, NJ
1977-01-27 Binghamton University - Binghamton, NY
1977-01-29 Georgetown Univ. Gym - Washington DC (Opening for Robert Palmer)
1977-01-30 Shea Auditorium @ William Patterson College - Wayne NJ
1977-02-03 Student Center Ballroom - Glassboro State, NJ
1977-02-04 Capitol Theatre - Passaic, NJ (Opening for The Kinks)
1977-02-05 Ballroom @ University of VW -Morgantown WV
1977-02-06 Roug's Club - Virginia Beach, VA
1977-02-10 Nassau Coliseum - Long Island NY (Opening for Boston)
1977-02-11 Little Night Music - University of PA
1977-02-12 Little Night Music University of PA
1977-02-15 Raffie Basile - Montclair, NJ
1977-02-17 Regent Theatre - Syracuse, NY
1977-02-18 Fairfield University, Fairfield, CT
1977-02-19 Harris Hall - New London, CT
1977-02-22 State College - Framingham, MA
1977-02-23 Amherst University - Amherst MA
1977-02-25 Middlebury College Field House - Middlebury, VT
1977-02-26 Stoneleith Burnham Prep School - Greenfield MA
1977-03-05 Canterbury Odeon, Kent, UK (Opening Act For Graham Parker and the Rumour)
1977-03-06 Fairfield Hall, Croydon, UK (Opening Act For Graham Parker and the Rumour)
1977-03-07 Dome, Brighton, UK (Opening Act For Graham Parker and the Rumour)
1977-03-08 Colston Hall, Bristol, UK (Opening Act For Graham Parker and the Rumour)
1977-03-09 Guild Hall, Portsmouth, UK (Opening Act For Graham Parker and the Rumour)
1977-03-13 Rainbow Theatre, London, UK (Opening Act For Graham Parker and the Rumour)
1977-03-15 Civic Hall, Guildford, UK (Opening Act For Graham Parker and the Rumour)
1977-03-16 City Hall, Sheffield, UK (Opening Act For Graham Parker and the Rumour)
1977-03-18 St. George's Hall, Bradford, UK (Opening Act For Graham Parker and the Rumour)
1977-03-19 Apollo Theatre, Glasgow, UK (Opening Act For Graham Parker and the Rumour)
1977-03-20 Music Hall, Aberdeen, UK (Opening Act For Graham Parker and the Rumour)
1977-03-21 Usher Hall, Edinburgh, UK (Opening Act For Graham Parker and the Rumour)
1977-03-23 City Hall, Newcastle, UK (Opening Act For Graham Parker and the Rumour)
1977-03-24 Odeon, Birmingham, UK (Opening Act For Graham Parker and the Rumour)
1977-03-25 Trent Poly, Nottingham, UK (Opening Act For Graham Parker and the Rumour)
1977-03-27 Gaumont, Ipswich, UK (Opening Act For Graham Parker and the Rumour)
1977-03-28 De Montford Hall, Leicester, UK (Opening Act For Graham Parker and the Rumour)
1977-03-29 Winter Gardens, Bournemouth, UK (Opening Act For Graham Parker and the Rumour)
1977-04-03 Palace Theatre, Manchester, UK (Opening Act For Graham Parker and the Rumour)
1977-04-06 The Rainbow - London UK (w Ronnie Spector)
1977-04-16 BBC Radio 1 - rock-on interview London UK (recorded earlier during tour)
1977-04-30 New Theatre, Oxford, UK (Opening Act For Graham Parker and the Rumour)
1977-05-01 Flying Machine - Akron, OH
1977-05-02 The Agora - Cleveland OH
1977-05-03 The Agora - Cleveland OH - (w Ronnie Spector)
1977-05-06 Commodore Ballroom - Lowell, MA
1977-05-07 Football Stadium - Univ. of Mass. - Amherst MA
1977-05-08 Football Stadium- Rutgers U.-New Brunswick NJ
1977-05-12 "Asbury All-Stars" Monmouth Arts Centre Redbank, NJ [Bruce filled in for SSJ who was ill – along with Ronnie Spector, the Asbury Jukes, Miami Steve & E Street Band]
1977-05-13 "Asbury All-Stars" Monmouth Arts Centre Redbank, NJ (1) Early show Bruce filled in for SSJ
1977-05-13 "Asbury All-Stars" Monmouth Arts Centre Redbank, NJ (1) Early show Bruce filled in for SSJ
1977-05-16 Bottom Line - New York, NY
1977-05-17 Bottom Line - New York, NY
1977-05-20 Werner Theatre - Washington DC
1977-05-21 Calderone Theatre - Hempstead, Long Island, NY
1977-05-22 Berkley Performing Arts Center - Boston, MA
1977-05-24 El Macombo Club - Toronto, Canada
1977-05-25 El Macombo Club - Toronto, Canada
1977-05-27 Sauer's Club - Chicago, IL
1977-05-28 Ivanhoe Club - Chicago, IL (w Ronnie Spector)
1977-05-29 Stone Lake - Stone Lake, WI (outdoors)
1977-05-30 State Theatre - St. Paul, MN
1977-05-31 Stone Hearth Clu" - Madison, WI
1977-06-02 Uptown Theatre - Milwaukee, WI
1977-06-03 Circle Theatre - Indianapolis, IN
1977-06-04 Taft Theatre - Cincinnati, OH
1977-06-05 Cleveland Stadium Cleveland, OH
1977-06-13 Bottom Line - NYC
1977-06-19 Tomorrow Club Youngstown, OH
1977-07-07 KYW-TV Studios - Philadelphia PA- Taping of "The Mike Douglas Show"
1977-07-11 "Ivanhoe Theatre" - ?
1977-07-30 Paramount Theatre, Asbury Park NJ
1977-09-28 Univ. So. Mississippi - Hattiesburg
1977-09-30 Dallas, Texas
1977-10-01 Roxy - Los Angeles CA
1977-10-02 Armadillo World Headquarters Austin,Texas
1977-10-13 Stone Pony - Asbury Park (w Bruce Springsteen)
1977-10-14 The Other Side - Philadelphia PA
1977-11-02 Skokvishal - Netherlands
1977-11-03 Paradiso - Amsterdam Netherlands
1977-11-06 De Lanteren - Rotterdam
1977-11-27 Radio London interview Charlie Gillet
1977-11-27 Eric's London UK
1977-12-xx Tomorrow Club - Youngstown Ohio
1977-12-02 Hunt Union Ballroom, Oneonta NY
1977-12-03 St. Peter's College
1977-12-08 Lafayette College
1977-12-31 Capitol Theater - Passaic NJ

Hearts Of Stone Tour (1978)

1978-01-01 The Parkwest - Chicago
1978-01-01 WMMR-FM - Philadelphia PA Interview
1978-02-11 Alexander's - Browns Mills, NJ
1978-02-18 Wilkins Theatre - Kean College - Union, NJ
1978-02-24 Rider College - Lawrenceville NJ
1978-03-18 Alexander's - Browns Mills, NJ
1978-03-21 The Roxy - Los Angeles, CA
1978-04-29 Bryant College - Bristol RI
1978-06-02 Great Adventure Park, Jackson NJ
1978-07-01 Paramount Theatre - Asbury Park, NJ
1978-07-08 Soldier Field - Chicago IL - (opening for The Rolling Stones and Journey)
1978-08-01 Seattle WA - FM radio
1978-08-07 Central Park NYC
1978-08-22 Joe Pop's - Shipbottom NJ
1978-08-30 Agora Ballroom - Cleveland OH
1978-09-12 "Tomorrow Club" - Youngstown, OH
1978-10-01 Radio Interview Cleveland
1978-10-01 WLIR-FM Long Island NY
1978-11-08 Palladium NYC
1978-11-11 Seattle Washington
1978-12-01 Veteran's Memorial - Columbus, OH (opening for J. Geils Band)
1978-12-02 Bowling Green Univ. - Bowling Green, OH (opening for J. Geils Band)
1978-12-03 Richfield Coliseum - Cleveland OH (opening for J. Geils Band)
1978-12-05 Park West Club - Chicago, IL
1978-12-06 Mississippi Nights - St. Louis, MO
1978-12-08 Aragon Ballroom - Chicago IL (opening for J. Geils)
1978-12-10 Guthrie Theatre - Minneapolis, MN
1978-12-12 Mecca Arena- Milwaukee, WI (opening for Bob Seger)
1978-12-13 Hara Sports Arena - Dayton OH (opening for J. Geils Band)
1978-12-14 Dane County Coliseum - Madison WI (opening for Bob Seger)
1978-12-15 Cobo Hall - Detroit MI (opening for J. Geils)
1978-12-16 Cobo Hall - Detroit, MI (opening for J. Geils)
1978-12-18 El Casino- Montreal, Canada CHOM-FM Broadcast
1978-12-19 El Macombo - Toronto, Canada
1978-12-26 Spectrum, Philadelphia PA
1978-12-27 Palladium, New York City
1978-12-28 Palladium, New York City
1978-12-30 Capitol Theatre, Passaic NJ
1978-12-31 Capitol Theater - Passaic NJ

The Jukes Tour (1979)

1979-xx-xx Interview by Jim Ladd
1979-xx-xx Odeon Cleveland, OH
1979-01-07 Interview WPIX-FM Studios NY - Blues DJ
1979-01-12 Soundstage Chicago, IL w/Junior Wells
1979-03-17 Calderone Concert Hall-Hempstead,NY
1979-06-10 Essen, Germany
1979-07-09 Fast Lane Asbury Pk, NJ - Jackie Wilson Benefit
1979-08-xx Seattle, WA
1979-08-09 Convention Hall, Asbury Park, NJ
1979-08-11 Knebworth Park
1979-08-15 Blossom Music Center Cuyahoga Falls, OH
1979-08-21 Belmont Park - Long Island NY
1979-09-07 Tower Theater - Philadelphia, PA
1979-09-15 The Granada Theater – Chicago, IL
1979-09-21 Rainbow Music Hall - Denver CO
1979-10-08 Paradiso – Amsterdam, Holland
1979-10-19 Gota Lejon Stockholm, Sweden
1979-10-23 Strathclyde University Glasgow, Scotland
1979-10-24 University Leeds, England
1979-10-26 Odeon Birmingham, England
1979-10-27 The Rainbow Theatre London, England
1979-10-28 The Venue - London UK
1979-10-29 The Dome Brighton, England
1979-11-07 Live at the Palladium - NY (WPLJ radio)
1979-11-14 Ryerson Theater - Toronto Canada
1979-12-31 Capitol Theater - Passaic NJ

Love Is A Sacrifice Tour (1980)

1980-xx-xx West Chester PA
1980-05-27 Guest DJ - WNEW-FM NYC
1980-07-05 Freehold Raceway NJ
1980-07-08 Poplar Creek - Chicago
1980-07-16 Mann Music Center - Philadelphia, PA
1980-07-17 Stanley Theater - Pittsburgh PA
1980-07-21 Westchester Premiere Theater - Tarrytown NY - King Biscuit
1980-08-03 Belmont Park - Long Island NY
1980-08-10 Dick Clark Theater - Westchester NY
1980-08-17 Pinecrest CC – Shelton, CT
1980-08-23 Belmont Park – Long Island, NY
1980-09-15 Agora Cleveland OH
1980-09-17 Trax - NYC
1980-09-29 Westminster College, New Wilmington PA
1980-10-13 Interview VPRO Holland
1980-12-31 Capitol Theater-Passaic NJ
1981-06-01 Great Adventure Arena - Jackson NJ
1981-07-10 Convention Hall - Atlantic City (concert for A/C Ambulance Corp)
1981-07-16 South Mountain Music Fair - West Orange NJ
1981-09-16 Fountain Casino - Matawan NJ
1981-10-18 The Bayou Club - Washington DC
1981-12-16 Capitol Theater (10th Anniversary Show)- Passaic NJ
1981-12-30 The Savoy - NY
1981-12-31 Capitol Theater - Passaic NJ
1982-02-14 Gainesville Florida
1982-03-20 Guest DJ - WMMR-FM Philadelphia PA
1982-05-29 Bever Brown w/Bruce Big Man's West
1982-07-02 Brendan Byrne Arena - Meadowlands NJ
1982-07-27 Bayou Club - Washington DC
1982-08-23 Belmont Park Long Island, NY
1982-09-06 Great Adventure Amusement Park, Jackson NJ
1982-12-17 Capitol Theater- Passaic NJ

Trash It Up Tour (1983)

1983-03-14 Bayou Club - Washington DC
1983-03-15 Stanley Theater Pittsburgh, PA? NJ?
"The Jukes" era began in the Summer of ‘83
1983-06-24 Stockholm Sweden
1983-07-02 Open Air Festival Roskilde - Copenhagen Denmark
1983-07-07 Grand Opera House - Wilmington, DE (early & late shows)
1983-07-15 Meadowlands Race Track East Rutherford NJ
1983-09-02 Rocky Point - Warwick RI
1983-10-09 Stitches Comedy Club - Boston MA
1983-10-24 Montclaire State College NJ
1983-10-26 Ripley's Music Hall - Philadelphia PA
1983-12-28 Monmouth Arts Center - Red Bank NJ
1983-12-29 WNEW-FM NYC (acoustic)
1983-12-29 WNEW-FM NYC (acoustic)
1983-12-31 Capitol Theater - Passaic NJ

In The Heat Tour (1984)

1984-02-25 Salle Franklin - Le Havre - Paris France w/Little Bob Story
1984-06-20 Moderna Museets Trädgård Sweden
1984-06-24 Rouen - France
1984-06-27 The Venue - London UK
1984-06-28 The Venue - London UK
1984-07-28 Garden State Arts Center - Holmdel NJ
1984-07-29 Valley Forge Music Fair - Devon PA
1984-08-12 Meadowlands NJ (w Springsteen)
1984-09-01 Interview WNEW-FM Studios NYC
1984-09-25 Morristown Community Theater NJ
1984-09-26 Morristown Community Theater NJ
1984-09-29 Ira S Wilson Ice Arena Geneseo NY
1984-10-16 Chestnut Caberet - Philadelphia PA
1984-10-31 The Ritz - Stockholm Sweden
1984-11-01 Alabamahalle Munich West Germany
1984-11-03 Karen - Gothenburg Sweden
1984-11-04 Malmo Sweden
1984-11-06 The Lyceum - London UK
1984-11-24 Telephone Interview - San Francisco Radio
1984-12-01 WNEW-FM NYC interview acoustic
1984-12-03 Tempe Arizona
1984-12-23 The Count Basie Theater - Red Bank NJ (La Bamba's Christmas Show)

 Serge Gainsbourg

Love On The Beat Tour (1985)

NOV
5
1985
ROUEN
Serge Gainsbourg at Hall des Expositions Foire de Lille, Lille, France
NOV
6
1985
NOV
7
1985
REIMS
NOV
8
1985
NANCY
NOV
9
1985
METZ
NOV
10
1985
STRASBOURG
NOV
11
1985
BESANCON
NOV
12
1985
CLERMONT
NOV
13 1985 & 14 Nov
1985
BORDEAUX
NOV
15
1985
NANTES
NOV
16
1985
QUIMPER
NOV
18
1985
LE MANS
NOV
19
1985
BRUXELLE BELGIUM
NOV
21
1985
LYON
NOV
22
1985
GRENOBLE
NOV
23
1985 
ST ETIENNE
NOV
25 1985 & 24
1985
MONTPELIER
NOV 
26
1985
TOULOUSE
NOV
28
1985
NICE
NOV
29
1985
MARSEILLE
Théâtre de Beaulieu, Lausanne,
NOV 
30 
1985

You're Under Arrest Tour (1988)
APRIL 2 1988 at Printemps de Bourges, France at Sports center
Toulouse, France in APRIL, 15 1988, 
MAY 4 1988 Patinoire de Malley France 
Lausanne, Switzerland in MAY, 12 1988 Foire Internationale
MAY 17 Metz, France  
30 MAY 1988 Parc des expositions, Caen, France, 
JULY 15 1988 Francofolies de La Rochelle France

Serge Gainsbourg did less in collaboration in 1988 because he was very exhausted has limestone plateau of the alcohol and the cigarette

Most of his concerts were registered and to film by spectator and put on the Internet in download and others not with regard to copyright because certainly were not registered or to film

Books 

 Beyond The Palace (Gary Wien) Southside Johnny & The Asbury Jukes
 Serge Gainsbourg (Année Héroique) Stéphane Deschamps
 Signé Gainsbourg (2013 at 2014) Love On The Beat, Sorry Angel, Charlotte For Ever, You're Under Arrest, Hey Man Amen & Made In China

Sites Web 
 Discogs: (Billy Rush)
 All Music: (Billy Rush)
 Billy Rush: Wikipedia version French

People from Deal, New Jersey
Musicians from Fort Lauderdale, Florida
1952 births
Living people
Guitarists from Florida
Guitarists from New Jersey
American male guitarists
20th-century American guitarists
20th-century American male musicians